The 1st Airmobile Brigade was a brigade in the German Army with its headquarters at the Fritzlar Air Base in North Hesse, It was part of the Airmobile Operations Division (Germany). The various elements of the brigade were located in the federal states of  Lower Saxony, Hesse and Bavaria. Parts of the brigade were classed as intervention forces.

History 
In October 2011 the German Federal Ministry of Defence announced a reorganisation/reduction of the German Armed Forces. As a result, 1st Airmobile Brigade was disbanded on 17 December 2013.

Structure 

 HQ Company
 1st Infantry Regiment (Jägerregiment 1)
 26th (Franconia) Attack Helicopter Regiment (Kampfhubschrauberregiment 26)
 36th Attack Helicopter Regiment (Kampfhubschrauberregiment 36)
 10th Transport Helicopter Regiment (Transporthubschrauberregiment 10)

Commanders 
The following commanders have led the Brigade:

References

External links 

Brigades of the Bundeswehr
Airmobile brigades
Military units and formations established in 1997
Military units and formations disestablished in 2013